Radamel Falcao García Zárate (born 10 February 1986) is a Colombian professional footballer who plays as a forward for La Liga club Rayo Vallecano and the Colombia national team. Nicknamed "El Tigre", he is considered one of the best strikers of his generation and one of the greatest Colombian footballers of all time.

Falcao began his professional career in the Argentinian league in River Plate, where he played with their youth academy from 2001 until 2004 and later won the 2007–08 Clausura tournament. In 2009–10, he joined Porto, where he won several trophies, including the UEFA Europa League and Primeira Liga double in 2011. In August 2011, Falcao moved to Spanish club Atlético Madrid for a club record €40 million. He was integral in the club's 2012 Europa League and Super Cup victories. Falcao was also prolific in La Liga during his time with Atlético, being the third-highest goalscorer in 2011–12 and 2012–13, both behind Lionel Messi and Cristiano Ronaldo.

Widely regarded as one of the best strikers in the world, Falcao controversially signed for newly promoted Ligue 1 side Monaco in 2013 for a club record €60 million, despite interest from top European clubs. In the second half of his debut season, an ACL injury ruled him out for six months; he went on to spend the next two seasons on loan at Premier League clubs Manchester United and Chelsea. Rejoining Monaco in the summer of 2016, he regained his best form and led them to their first Ligue 1 title in 17 years. Falcao joined Turkish club Galatasaray in 2019, before returning to La Liga in 2021 with Rayo Vallecano. 

Falcao made his senior debut for Colombia in 2007, and has since earned over 100 caps and scored 36 goals, making him their all-time top scorer since breaking the previous record of 25 goals in June 2017. He represented his country at the 2011, 2015 and 2019 Copa América. Falcao missed the 2014 FIFA World Cup through injury, but made his World Cup debut at the 2018 tournament in Russia.

Falcao is Porto's all-time top goalscorer in international club competitions, set the record for most goals (17) in a European campaign in 2011, is the first player to win consecutive Europa League titles with two teams (Porto in 2011 and Atlético in 2012), and is Monaco's highest goalscorer this century (83). He was named in the FIFA FIFPro World XI in 2012, finished in fifth place for the 2012 FIFA Ballon d'Or, and was awarded the 2012 Globe Soccer Best Footballer. In November 2018, Falcao was honoured by the Atlético Madrid fans with a plaque outside the Metropolitano Stadium.

Club career

Lanceros Boyacá
Falcao made his debut for Lanceros Boyacá in the Colombian Categoría Primera B (second tier) on 28 August 1999, playing the last 40 minutes against Deportivo Pereira at the age of 13 years and 199 days, thus becoming the youngest debutant at that level of Colombian professional football. In 2000, Lanceros' coach, Hernán Pacheco, began to consider the 14-year-old more seriously; Falcao played seven matches that year. On 23 July, at the Estadio Olímpico del Sol in Sogamoso, he scored his first and only goal for the club, to seal a 2–0 win against Club El Cóndor that took Lanceros off the bottom of the table. In his two years with the club, he played eight matches and scored once.

River Plate
After training with Millonarios, who did not take up their option to purchase the player, Falcao was sold to River Plate of Argentina in February 2001, for a $500,000 fee. He began his River career in the youth team, playing in the eighth division of Argentine football. River's coach, Leonardo Astrada, gave Falcao his professional debut in the 2005 Torneo Clausura, on 6 March 2005, in a game that finished in a 3–1 victory for his club against Instituto de Córdoba.

Falcao became a regular in the first team during the 2005 Torneo Apertura. He scored twice in a match for the first time in Argentina, on 2 October in a game against Independiente that finished as a 3–1 win for River. He repeated the feat twice more during the Apertura: against Lanús, his brace contributed to a 4–1 home win, and against San Lorenzo, River won 5–1. This brought his total for the competition to seven from as many games under the management of Reinaldo Merlo, who gave Falcao the trust he needed to establish himself in the team.

In the match against San Lorenzo in November, Falcao injured the ligaments of his right knee and missed the remainder of the Apertura; then, during pre-season training in January 2006, he sustained more serious damage to the same knee, which required surgery and was expected to keep him out for at least six months. He returned to the field in September, soon after the start of the 2006 Torneo Apertura, in which he made 12 appearances, mainly as a substitute; he scored just once, to seal a 2–0 win against Rosario Central that took River clear at the top of the table. A few days earlier, he made his debut in CONMEBOL competition, in the last eight of the 2006 Copa Sudamericana against Atlético Paranaense of Brazil. He was replaced at half-time, and the match finished 2–2; this meant River were eliminated on aggregate, as they lost the home leg 1–0.

He was sent off in his only outing in the 2007 Copa Libertadores, against Colo-Colo on 22 February 2007. Domestically, he made little impression on the 2007 Torneo Clausura. He scored in only one of the eight games he played: River's first two goals as they beat Racing Club 4–2 away from home. Falcao scored his first professional hat-trick on 27 September 2007, as River made a historic comeback against Botafogo to win the series 4–3 after trailing 3–1 on aggregate and progress into the quarter-finals of the 2007 Copa Sudamericana. The following week, he scored his first goal in a Superclásico, the first of River's goals as they beat Boca Juniors 2–0.

River Plate were reported to have rejected a $15 million offer from Milan for Falcao in early 2008, as well as bids from clubs including Aston Villa and Fluminense. On 27 February, Falcao scored, but was red-carded, in a 2–1 win over Club América in the 2008 Copa Libertadores group stage. He was a key player as Diego Simeone led River to the 2008 Torneo Clausura championship, his first domestic title, and his performances linked him with moves to a variety of clubs, including Man United and Arsenal. Nevertheless, he remained with River as they suffered the worst campaign in their history, finishing bottom of the 2008 Torneo Apertura.

In 2009, River Plate had a difficult start: they were eliminated in the group stage of the 2009 Copa Libertadores and won few games at the beginning of the 2009 Torneo Clausura. Falcao retained his eye for goal and was instrumental in Nestor Gorosito's plans, having matured as a striker over the previous two years; he finished as top scorer with 43 goals.

Porto

2009–10 season

On 15 July 2009, Primeira Liga team Porto signed Falcao on a four-year-contract worth €3.93 million for 60% of his economic rights after Porto sold striker Lisandro López to Olympique Lyon for €24 million. In the transaction, Porto also sold Mario Bolatti for €1.5 million to a third party owner, Natland Financier B.V., in exchange for 35% of the economic rights of Falcao. A week before, Porto rivals Benfica came very close to signing Falcao after making a €4.7 million offer, but the reluctance of the club to pay an additional €700,000 requested by Falcao for awards and delayed salaries dictated the end of negotiations, which prompted Falcao to join Porto a week later. He made his debut against Paços de Ferreira on the opening matchday and scored an important goal to earn the team a draw. He went on to score three goals in as many games, making him one of the few to score four goals in the first four matchdays of the Portuguese league.

On 15 September, he made his UEFA Champions League debut in a 1–0 away defeat against Chelsea. Two weeks later, on 30 September, he scored his first Champions League goal, a backheel, in a 2–0 group stage win over his future club, Atlético Madrid. On 12 December, Falcao scored a header to defeat rivals Sporting CP in a 1–0 home victory. On 10 January 2010, Falcao scored a brace, including the winning goal, in a 3-2 league victory over Uniao de Leiria. On 2 February, Falcao scored twice in a 5–2 Taça de Portugal quarter-finals victory against rivals Sporting CP. In the same month, he scored the winning goal in a UEFA Champions League round of 16 2–1 victory over Arsenal, his fourth goal in the tournament, even though Porto were later eliminated from the competition. On 3 April, Falcao scored a brace against Marítimo to lead the scoring charts with 20 goals, although he would eventually finish the season as the second-highest league scorer with 25 goals, behind only Benfica's Óscar Cardozo, who had 26. Falcao later scored two more braces in away victories over Vitoria Setubal and Leiria on 24 April and 8 May respectively. He scored in his last game of the season, the 2010 Taça de Portugal Final, where Porto won 2–1 against Chaves. Falcao wrapped up the campaign with a career-high 34 goals in all competitions.

2010–11 season
Falcao made an impressive start to the 2010–11 season, scoring a goal in the 2010 Portuguese Super Cup 2–0 victory over Benfica. He scored his first two league goals on the second matchday of the season in a 3–0 victory against Beira-Mar on 22 August 2010. He scored his second double for the club in a 5–1 victory over União de Leiria on 25 October. On 7 November, he scored twice, one of them a backheel goal, in a 5–0 victory against the defending champions Benfica.

On 2 December, Falcao scored his first hat-trick for Porto in a 3–1 victory against Rapid Wien during a UEFA Europa League clash, becoming the top goal scorer with seven goals. On 7 April 2011, Falcao scored another hat-trick and provided an assist in the quarter-finals of the Europa League against Russian side Spartak Moscow in a 5–1 victory, bringing his goal tally in the tournament to ten. In the second leg, he scored another goal and provided another assist in another victory with the same scoreline in a 10–3 aggregate thrashing that took Porto to the tournament's semi-final stage.

On 17 April, he scored a double against rivals Sporting CP to help defeat them 3-2. He further added to his position as top scorer in the Europa League by scoring four goals in the semi-final against Villarreal two weeks later, which finished 5–1 for Porto. In the Europa League final against domestic rivals Braga, Falcao scored the only goal of the game with a header after a cross from Fredy Guarín, giving the title to Porto. He set a new goalscoring record of 17 goals in 14 games during the Europa League campaign, surpassing Jürgen Klinsmann's previous record of 15 goals. In July 2011, Falcao extended his contract until 2015 with an added €45 million buy-out clause. Porto paid a commission of €6.58 million to extend the contract.

Atlético de Madrid

2011–12 season
On 18 August 2011, Atlético announced they had signed Falcao from Porto on a €40 million transfer fee; the fee could potential rise to €50 million based on performance-based clauses, making him the most expensive player in the club's history. Atlético and the Colombian forward also agreed on a four-year-contract.

Falcao made his Atlético debut on 11 September away to Valencia, playing the full 90 minutes in a 1–0 defeat. A week later, on 18 September, Falcao scored his first hat trick for Atlético in a 4–0 win against Racing Santander. On 3 November, Falcao netted a goal in Atlético's 4–0 triumph over Udinese – the goal meant that Falcao had scored 19 goals in his last 18 Europa League games.

Falcao's second hat-trick in La Liga came on 21 January 2012, when he led his team to a 4–0 victory against Real Sociedad at the Anoeta Stadium. On 16 February, in the first leg of the Europa League round of 32, Falcao scored twice and assisted a goal in an 3–1 away victory against Lazio to progress to the round of 16. In the second leg of Atlético's Round of 16 clash against Turkish club Beşiktaş, Falcao scored one goal and provided Eduardo Salvio's goal in a 3–0 victory, advancing 6–1 on aggregate. On 21 March, Falcao netted a second half double to propel his side to a 2–1 victory over Athletic Bilbao and keep Atlético in the race for European places. In both legs of the Europa League quarter-final tie versus Hannover 96, Falcao managed to score a goal in each leg, helping Atlético seal a 4–2 aggregate victory and increasing his goal tally to eight in the competition.

Falcao played his first Madrid Derby against Real Madrid on 11 April 2012. He had missed the first match at the Santiago Bernabéu Stadium due to injury, and scored Atlético's only goal as his side fell 4–1 due to a hat trick by Cristiano Ronaldo. Four days later, he scored his 30th goal of the season in all competitions against Rayo Vallecano in a crucial 1–0 victory for Atlético. In the first leg of the 2011–12 Europa League semi-finals against Valencia, Falcao scored a double in a 4–2 victory while making Atlético the first team to win ten consecutive matches in a single Europa League season. Falcao added to his Europa League tally in the final against fellow La Liga side Athletic Bilbao, netting Atlético's opening two goals in a 3–0 triumph at the Arena Națională in Bucharest on 9 May 2012. In so doing, Falcao not only became the top goal scorer in a Europa league season again, with 12 goals, but became the first player in history to win two consecutive Europa League titles with two different teams. Four days after the final, Falcao scored the only goal late into a match against Villarreal to give his team a victory in the last game of the season. After his outstanding debut season with the club, his purchase was called the "best purchase of the 21st century".

2012–13 season
Falcao scored two hat-tricks at the start of the 2012–13 season; first in the league game against 2012 Europa League finalists Athletic Bilbao on 27 August 2012, and the second in the 4–1 defeat of Chelsea during the 2012 UEFA Super Cup on 31 August 2012. At the same time, Falcao became the first player in history to score a hat trick in a UEFA Super Cup final in its current format; the original format was two legged before turning into a single legged final format in 1998. After the match, Simeone described Falcao's performance as "indescribable". On 16 September, Falcao scored what turned out to be the decisive goal from the penalty spot in a 4–3 win over Rayo Vallecano, and did the same a week later in a 2–1 triumph against Real Valladolid, before going off at half-time in order to avoid a possible groin injury. Falcao scored a double in a 4–2 away victory over Real Betis, converting a cross for the first and then a penalty, putting him to the top of the goal scoring charts in La Liga with seven goals. In October 2012, he was nominated for the 2012 FIFA Ballon d'Or, and came in 5th place. He was also in the 2012 FIFPro World XI.

On 7 October, Falcao scored a header early into the game against Málaga, and also forced Málaga defender Weligton to score an own goal, giving Atlético the 2–1 victory in the final minute. Three weeks later, he scored once again versus Real Sociedad, this time with a rare free-kick which was a last minute winner in the 1–0 victory. That was Falcao's first professional free kick goal. In a match against Sevilla, Falcao scored a penalty and assisted another goal in a 4–0 victory; the strike marked his 50th goal for Atlético. In the 6–0 victory against Deportivo de La Coruña on 9 December, Falcao scored an astonishing five goals, becoming the first player in La Liga since Fernando Morientes in 2002 to net five goals in a match.

Falcao missed the first La Liga match of 2013 due to muscle fatigue, but returned in the second match against Real Zaragoza on 13 January, where he scored a penalty in a 2-0 victory. In the first leg of the Copa del Rey quarter-finals against Betis, Falcao scored a header in a 2–0 victory on 18 January. He suffered an muscle injury in a match on 20 January, causing him to miss 3 games, including the second leg of the Copa del Rey quarter final against Betis and the first leg of the semi finals against Sevilla. Falcao returned for the second leg to score against Sevilla in a 2–2 draw, helping Atlético advance to the finals with a 4–3 aggregate scoreline. Falcao scored a double against Granada in a comfortable 5–0 victory on 14 April. The second goal marked Falcao's 200th career goal (counting both club and nation). A week later, Falcao scored the only goal in a 0–1 away victory against Sevilla at the Ramón Sánchez Pizjuán Stadium.

In the Madrid Derby the following week, Falcao scored Atlético's only goal once more, albeit in a 1–2 home loss. That goal was Falcao's 50th league goal with the club in just 64 appearances. On 8 May, Falcao scored the last goal for Atlético in a 3–1 away victory over Celta de Vigo. The win assured Atlético Madrid would appear in the next season's Champions League for the first time in four years. He scored his last league goal that season in a 1–2 loss against Barcelona four days later. Falcao ended the season with 28 league goals, putting him third in the top scorers chart, only behind Lionel Messi and Cristiano Ronaldo. In the 2013 Copa del Rey Final, Atlético were trailing 1–0 when Falcao delivered a timely assist to Diego Costa to tie the game. They went on to win 2–1 and defeat their arch-rivals Real Madrid for the first time in 14 years. This was Falcao's first and only domestic cup title with Atlético.

Monaco

In May 2013, Atlético Madrid general manager Miguel Ángel Gil Marín announced that the club would not stand in the way if Falcao decided to leave, and that he and the club would support him in his decision. Despite being linked with various clubs such as Atlético Madrid's city rivals Real Madrid and English side Chelsea, he eventually signed for newly promoted Ligue 1 side Monaco on 31 May 2013. Falcao subsequently signed a five-year contract for an undisclosed fee, believed to be around €60 million, with his net annual salary at Monaco being reported to be around €14 million. Despite the Colombian showing optimism about his Monaco future, Falcao gave an emotional farewell to Atlético during a press interview, expressing his enjoyment with the club and considering it to be "the best time of his career". Falcao went on to say that part of his reason for choosing Monaco was to follow the footsteps of his idol, Thierry Henry. Monaco sporting director Vadim Vasilyev said that the club hoped to build a team around Falcao and provide a direct challenge in Ligue 1 to Qatari backed PSG. The Colombian forward added that he wanted to bring Monaco "to the top of European Football." 

Falcao's move to Monaco was a generally considered a surprise as he was widely regarded as the best and most sought after striker in the world. According to Sportskeeda, a major factor in Falcao's move to Monaco was his third-party ownership: in 2009, when wanting to move out of South America from River Plate to Porto, Falcao became a property of a group named Doyen Sports, which from that moment onwards owned a 55% stake in him. Doyen Sports wanted him to become more profitable, though eventually had invested too much in Falcao. Subsequently, Doyen Sports desperately wanted to cash Falcao out for a profit and Monaco were the only club who could manage the funds for Falcao's transfer.

2013–14 season

Falcao made his Ligue 1 debut in the first match against Bordeaux on 10 August, where he managed to score in the 88th minute, sealing a 2–0 victory. Eight days later, he scored the opening goal, a penalty, in a 4–1 victory against Montpellier. In a match against Marseille on 1 September, Falcao scored the equalizer in a 2–1 victory. In a match against Lorient, Falcao scored an early penalty kick, which proved to be the winner in a 1–0 victory. Falcao managed to equalize with a diving header in a tough away match against French champions Paris Saint-Germain; the game would end 1–1 and keep Monaco on top of the league table. Days later, Falcao scored a double against Bastia in a 3–0 victory. This also brought his goal tally to seven, making him top scorer in Ligue 1.

Falcao ended his four-game goal drought for Monaco in a 2–1 win over Lyon, scoring with an impressive chip. On 27 November, it was reported that Falcao failed to fully recover from a thigh injury prior to his last match for the club, and he was forced to miss the next four league matches. Falcao made his return after being brought on within the second half against Valenciennes, where he missed a penalty kick as Monaco lost 2–1.

Falcao was reportedly heavily linked with Chelsea during the winter transfer window, with Chelsea even agreeing to an "£80 million deal" with Monaco, but Vasilvey denied these rumours and said Falcao "wasn't going anywhere" and is "very happy at the club."

Falcao started 2014 by making his Coupe de France debut in a match against Vannes, where he both assisted and scored a goal in a 3–2 victory. Falcao's second goal of the month came in the Coupe de France once more, where he scored a goal before being substituted due to an injury sustained in the first half of a 0–3 victory against Monts d'Or Azergues Foot.

On 23 January, the club confirmed on its website that Falcao had suffered a severe ACL injury in his left knee that would require 6 months to recover, and would also miss the 2014 FIFA World Cup, while effectively ending his 2013–14 season entirely. Falcao went on to say that he and his doctors were confident in a speedy recovery. Falcao also went on to say that he wanted to play in the match himself, and that Monaco head coach Claudio Ranieri did not force him to.

2014–15 season
Falcao's full recovery was confirmed in mid-July, where he would play regularly in pre-season matches for Monaco after six months sidelined. He returned on the field at the Emirates Cup coming on as a substitute for Dimitar Berbatov in the 72nd minute as Monaco drew 2–2 against Spanish side Valencia. The next day, he played the first hour of the match against Arsenal and scored the only goal of the game in the 36th minute.

On 10 August, in his first competitive match since his injury, Falcao came on for Lucas Ocampos after 59 minutes and scored a penalty, though Monaco lost 2–1 at home to Lorient. Two weeks later, he started away to Nantes and scored the only goal of the game, heading in Layvin Kurzawa's cross before half-time for the club's first points of the season. Amidst rumours of a transfer, Falcao was not included in Monaco's next match against Lille, and watched from the stands next to club owner Vadim Vasilyev. Falcao's father later said that Falcao left Monaco because they changed the "original plan" and decided to sell all the players they had bought, mostly referring to the departure of James Rodriguez to Real Madrid.

Loan to Manchester United

On 1 September 2014, Manchester United agreed to sign Falcao on a season-long loan for £6 million subject to a medical examination with an option to sign permanently for £43.5 million (€55 million) at season's end. The deal saw him earn £265,000 per week at the club. Manchester City had previously opted out of signing him due to squad size, and he had also been linked to Juventus, Arsenal, and Real Madrid. United confirmed the transfer in the early hours of 2 September. Despite joining temporarily under a loan contract, Falcao said he would fight to stay at United for many years and become a legend at the club. Cristiano Ronaldo praised Falcao and United for the transfer, calling him a "top, quality, very good player", saying that United did "very well" and that he was a "fantastic buy."

Falcao made his debut at Old Trafford on 14 September, playing the final 23 minutes of a 4–0 win over Queens Park Rangers in place of Juan Mata, as United won for the first time in the season. His debut was marked by rapturous applause from the club's supporters as they continuously chanted his name both while he was warming up and on the pitch. On 5 October, he scored his first goal for United, the winner in a 2–1 home victory against Everton. On 8 December, Falcao was left on the bench over 19-year-old James Wilson against Southampton, and Van Gaal later said that Falcao "was only fit enough to play 20 minutes." On 20 December, Falcao made his return for the first time in the starting line-up to score a goal in the second half in a 1–1 draw with Aston Villa. Six days later, he provided an assist for Wayne Rooney against Newcastle United, and United went on to win the match 3–1. On New Year's Day 2015, Falcao equalised against Stoke City in a 1–1 away draw.

After being left out of the squad against Southampton on 11 January in favor of 19-year-old James Wilson again, Van Gaal said he did not regret making that decision, and furthermore, his future at United was put under doubt when his agent, Jorge Mendes, stated a few days later that his client "may not be at Old Trafford at the start of next season". After failing to offer any shots, either on or off target, and only having 26 touches against League One side Preston North End on 17 February, Martin Keown, a BBC commentator, described his performance as "another night of nothing from Falcao" and questioned if he was "fit enough". On 10 March, a day after being an unused substitute as United were knocked out of the FA Cup at home by Arsenal, Falcao played for their under-21 team in a 1–1 draw with Tottenham Hotspur, being substituted after 72 minutes. The demotion was publicly criticised by former footballers Dietmar Hamann and Willem van Hanegem, whom had described the decision Van Gaal made to be "disrespectful and disgraceful", despite Van Gaal saying that he didn't "intend to humiliate" Falcao. Diego Maradona also criticised Van Gaal for his treatment of Falcao, saying, "he was closer to the devil than anything." At season's end, he was adjudged by many to be among the worst signings of the season. On 24 May 2015, United announced their decision to not exercise their buy option on Falcao, ending a spell at the club in which he scored 4 goals in 29 appearances.

Loan to Chelsea

On 3 July 2015, Chelsea signed Falcao on a season-long loan deal worth £4 million with the option of a permanent transfer at the end of the season for a fee of £38 million (€50 million), and with a salary of £170,000 a week. The move briefly reunited him with his Colombia teammate Juan Cuadrado and former Atlético Madrid teammates Diego Costa and Thibaut Courtois. Midfielder Mario Pašalić went to Monaco on loan in exchange for Falcao joining Chelsea.

Falcao made his debut on 2 August in the 2015 FA Community Shield at Wembley Stadium, replacing Loïc Rémy at half time as Chelsea lost 1–0 to rivals Arsenal. His league debut came six days later in a 2–2 home draw with Swansea City, playing the final six minutes in place of Willian. On 29 August, again as a replacement for Willian, Falcao scored his first and only Chelsea goal, equalising in an eventual 1–2 home defeat to Crystal Palace. On 3 November, Falcao picked up a muscular injury in training, and was ruled out for a "few weeks". On 30 December, he reinjured his thigh, and new manager Guus Hiddink said he "might be fit again within 10 days, although not to play." However, on 15 January 2016, Hiddink confirmed that Falcao's latest injury setback was "very serious". He was dropped from the team's Champions League squad the following month, in favour of new addition Alexandre Pato.

2016–17 season

Upon Falcao's return to Monaco in July 2016, he was made team captain by coach Leonardo Jardim. On 27 July, Falcao scored for Monaco in his first appearance for the club in two seasons; a Champions League qualifier against Fenerbahçe. On 17 September, he scored his first Ligue 1 goal of the season in a 3–0 win over Stade Rennais at the Stade Louis II. On 5 November, he scored twice in the first half as Monaco defeated Nancy 6–0 in a league match, following his two first-half goals against CSKA Moscow in a Champions League group stage match three days earlier.

On 3 December, he scored two goals against Bastia in a 5–0 win. A week later, on 10 December, Falcao scored his first Ligue 1 hat-trick in a 4–0 win against Bordeaux which boosted his 2016–17 season tally to 14 goals in 15 competitive games, and 10 goals in Ligue 1 with just 579 minutes of Ligue 1 playing time, meaning that Falcao scored an average of one Ligue 1 goal in every 58 minutes of Ligue 1 playing time.

On 4 February 2017, Falcao scored a brace in a 3–0 victory over Nice. A week later, he scored another brace, this time in a 5–0 victory over Metz. On 21 February, Falcao scored two goals; the first with a diving header from Fabinho's cross from the right and the second with a chip over Willy Caballero, but missed a penalty in a 5–3 away loss to Manchester City in the Champions League round of 16 first leg match. Despite him missing out at the second leg at home due to injury, Monaco eventually won the match 3–1 (6–6 on aggregate) and qualified to the quarter-finals on away goals rule. On 19 April, he scored Monaco's second in their 3–1 victory over Borussia Dortmund to put the team into the Champions League semi-finals for the first time since 2004. Falcao scored a brace on the final league matchday in a 4–0 victory against Lille on 14 May. Falcao ended the season claiming the Ligue 1 title and as the club's top scorer with 30 goals in 43 appearances. On 1 June, Falcao extended his contract a further three years, keeping him at the club until 2020.

2017–18 season
Falcao started off the season with a goal in Monaco's first league match, Monaco's second in a 3–2 win at home to Toulouse. Two weeks later, he scored the first hat-trick of the Ligue 1 season in a 4-1 win against Dijon. He then scored the only goal against Metz, and a week later scored a double – including a penalty – against Marseille, raising his tally to seven goals in four matches. Falcao's form led him to being nominated for 2017 Ballon d'Or. After losing a match 4-0 at the hands of OGC Nice, Falcao responded with two more braces against Strasbourg and Lille respectively. Upon scoring for Monaco against former club FC Porto in a Champions League game in December 2017, Falcao refused to celebrate out of respect to his former club. He was applauded by Porto fans for the gesture. Five days later, he opened his mark in the Coupe de la Ligue match vs Caen, which ended in a 2-0 win. On 31 January 2018, he scored a double against Montpellier at the Stade Louis II to help send Monaco to the final, where Monaco eventually lost 3-0 to PSG. Falcao finished the season as top scorer with 18 league goals in 26 matches.

2018–19 season
Falcao began the season on a high note during Monaco's first match of the season, assisting Monaco's second and scoring their third in a 3–1 away victory against Nantes. He scored the decisive goal in a 1–0 victory against Caen on 24 November 2018, a free-kick which ended Monaco's winless streak of 13 games. Four days later, Falcao played against his former club Atletico Madrid for the first time since his departure in 2013 as part of a Champions League group stage match. Monaco eventually lost 2–0, and Falcao missed a penalty. On 4 December 2018, Falcao scored two penalties in an 0–2 away win against Amiens. On 22 January 2019, Falcao opened his tally in the Coupe de France, scoring in a 1–3 loss to Metz. Despite Falcao's goal, Monaco were eliminated from the competition. Although he finished as Monaco's top scorer with 16 goals across all competitions, this was certainly a season to forget for the club, as they barely avoided relegation and finished in 17th place.

Galatasaray

2019–20 season
On 2 September 2019, Falcao joined Süper Lig club Galatasaray on a free transfer, as his contract with Monaco had expired, with a three-year contract and a salary of €5 million per year. He was welcomed by over 25,000 fans on the previous day at the Istanbul Atatürk Airport. He scored a goal on his debut in a 1–0 home win against Kasimpasa on 13 September. In a Turkish Cup match against Tuzlaspor on 17 December, he scored a goal to help his team make it to the next round and overturn a 0–2 first leg loss. On 28 December, he scored his first brace with the club in a 5–0 win over Antalyaspor at home. On 1 March 2020, he scored his first brace of the year against Gençlerbirliği in a 3–0 win at the Türk Telekom Stadium.

Falcao played 22 matches, scored 11 goals, and got one assist in all competitions during the season.

2020–21 season
Falcao began the season by scoring twice and assisting in his club's league debut victory against Gaziantep on 12 September 2020. On 11 April 2021, Falcao collided with Kerem Aktürkoğlu head-on during a training session and was taken to the hospital. He was diagnosed with a facial bone fracture and had surgery. After 2 weeks, he started training with a mask.

He finished the season with 17 games, 9 goals and 2 assists. Falcao missed 24 games during the season due to injuries.

2021–22 season
In an official statement made by Galatasaray on 1 September 2021, Falcao and the club mutually agreed to terminate the player's contract.

The Colombian striker's time at Galatasaray was plagued with injuries. He missed 49 matches during his time at the Turkish club, (24 in 2019–20, 25 in 2020–21), and played 43 out of 92 possible games.

Rayo Vallecano
On 4 September 2021, Falcao signed for La Liga club Rayo Vallecano. He was presented at the Estadio de Vallecas on 16 September 2021 before 2,000 fans. Falcao chose to the jersey number 3, an unfamiliar number mostly worn by defenders and is not traditionally associated with attacking players. His decision to don that jersey was to honour his late father Radamel García, who played as a defender and mostly played with that jersey number. The number 3 jersey was being worn by Fran García at Rayo Vallecano before his arrival, however García agreed and switched to the number 33 to make that available for him. He made his debut with Rayo in a home fixture versus Getafe CF on 18 September 2021, scoring one goal in a 3–0 win. Falcao scored the only goal in a famous league win over Barcelona on 27 October. The result led to the sacking of Barcelona manager Ronald Koeman.

International career

Youth level and early international career
Falcao participated with the Colombia national under-17 team at the 2001 South American U-17 Championship, where he played four matches and scored one goal against Bolivia. He was also called up to the U-17 team for the 2003 FIFA U-17 World Championship, but sustained an injury before the tournament and had to drop out.

Falcao's first call-up to the under-20 team was for the friendly tournament, Copa Simón Bolívar, in 2003. He played in the 2004 Toulon Tournament, scoring his only goal at the tournament against Turkey. In the 2005 South American U-20 Championship, where he was champion with his team, he played five matches and scored once, on 23 January in the 1–1 draw against Argentina. In the 2005 FIFA World Youth Championship, Falcao played three matches and scored twice, against Canada and Syria.

On 7 February 2007, Falcao made his senior team debut against Uruguay, and scored his first goal on 3 June against Montenegro in the Kirin Cup. Falcao played his first competitive match on 13 October against Brazil. The match finished in a 0–0 draw.

Falcao wasn't able to participate in the 2010 World Cup qualification matches against Chile, Paraguay and Brazil due to an injury he suffered with River Plate. He returned to action and scored the only goal of the game in a friendly against Nigeria on 19 November 2008. On 10 June 2009, he scored the only goal of the 2010 World Cup qualifying match to give Colombia the victory against Peru at Estadio Atanasio Girardot. In total, Falcao played 10 games and scored once during the qualifying campaign.

2011–2013: First Copa América and World Cup qualification
After missing the 2007 edition due to injuries, Falcao's first major international tournament was the 2011 Copa América in Argentina. After failing to score against Costa Rica and the hosts, he netted both goals in a 2–0 win against Bolivia, the second a penalty, leading Colombia to top their group. In the quarter-finals, Falcao missed a penalty kick against Peru, which would have won the game had it gone in, and the opponents were able to score two goals in extra time to eliminate his team.

Falcao's first match in the 2014 FIFA World Cup qualifiers started off with a goal against Bolivia in the last minute of added time, giving Colombia the win on 11 October 2011 at the Estadio Hernando Siles. Under new management of the national team led by Argentine José Pékerman, Falcao scored a goal against Mexico in a friendly that ended 2–0. On 7 September 2012, Falcao scored a header in the second minute to help Colombia win 4–0 against Uruguay. In the same match, he assisted Juan Camilo Zúñiga, for Colombia's fourth goal in the final minutes of stoppage time. Falcao scored again days later and assisted Teófilo Gutiérrez against Chile to help give Colombia a 3–1 away win after having trailed 0–1 in Santiago. This result put Los Cafeteros second in the table, one point behind Argentina. On 12 October 2012, Falcao scored both goals in a 2–0 victory over Paraguay.

In Falcao's first game of 2013, he scored the fourth goal during a 5–0 qualifier victory against Bolivia in March. Falcao scored a penalty against Peru in the 13th minute where Colombia won 2–0. On 11 October 2013, in the penultimate World Cup qualifying match against Chile, Falcao scored two penalties to tie 3–3 after trailing 3–0. This result ensured Colombia qualified for the World Cup for the first time since 1998. Falcao ended the 2014 FIFA World Cup qualification campaign as Colombia's top scorer, with nine goals in thirteen appearances.

2014–2017: ACL injury, World Cup absence, and all-time top goalscorer
On 23 January 2014, due to a severe ACL injury, it was announced that Falcao would likely miss the World Cup. However, Falcao expressed his optimism, believing that it was possible to make a speedy recovery. Falcao received tremendous support worldwide on social media for a speedy recovery; a social media movement entitled 'Fuerza Tigre' (meaning 'stay strong Tiger' in Spanish) rapidly grew popularity. Among those who wished him a quick recovery was Pau Gasol, professional basketball player in the NBA. Juan Manuel Santos, former president of Colombia, visited Falcao in the hospital he was staying at in Porto.

On 5 February, Falcao was included in José Pékerman's initial 30-man squad for the World Cup. In mid-May, Falcao's father, Radamel García, told RCN Radio that Falcao was "60 percent fit, but not fully match-fit." In March, his surgeon said there was "no reason why Falcao couldn't play at the World Cup." On 25 May, Falcao arrived in Argentina to train with the rest of the squad. However, he eventually made the decision not to join the squad as he did not feel right taking up a position if not at full health, and was left out of the final 23-man-squad on 2 June.

Falcao would score his first international goal in 11 months against El Salvador on 10 October 2014, after starting for the first time since his ACL injury. It was his first ever headed goal for his country while influencing the other two goals in a 3–0 victory. His last goal before the injury was in a 2–0 friendly victory against Belgium in November 2013. In a friendly against Bahrain on 26 March 2015, Falcao assisted one goal and scored a double in a 6–0 win. Four days later, he scored his 24th goal for the country and put himself one goal shy of equalling Arnoldo Iguarán's record with a penalty in a 3–1 win over Kuwait.

On 6 June, he tied the record as Colombia's all-time top scorer by scoring his 25th goal in a 1–0 friendly victory against Costa Rica in Buenos Aires ahead of the 2015 Copa América. He captained the team at the tournament, despite having a shoddy season, but failed to score and grab any assists in three group matches. He didn't start the quarter-final against Argentina on 26 June, and came on as a substitute for Jackson Martínez in the 74th minute; Colombia ended up losing 5–4 on penalties.

On 4 November 2016, Falcao was recalled to the Colombia squad for the first time in 388 days for Colombia's next two 2018 FIFA World Cup qualifying matches against Chile on 10 November and Argentina on 15 November. He had last played for Colombia on 13 October 2015, in a 3–0 loss to Uruguay in a 2018 World Cup qualifying match in Montevideo, and had not been selected in Colombia's squad for the Copa América Centenario.

On 7 June 2017, Falcao became the Colombia national team's all-time top-goalscorer, scoring his 26th goal in a 2–2 draw with Spain. He went on to score twice in the team's four remaining World Cup qualifying matches, as Colombia confirmed their qualification for the 2018 FIFA World Cup on 10 October 2017. The last qualifying match against Peru ended up in a 1–1 draw, a result that sent Colombia through automatically and Peru into a play-off with New Zealand at Chile's expense as they lost to Brazil. Footage emerged of Falcao talking to the Peruvian players in what was suggested could be an alleged "pact" to see both teams through. Peruvian midfielder Renato Tapia admitted to the speculation by saying that the Colombians approached them about the draw as they knew the results of the other games. Falcao admitted to knowing what was happening in the other games, but denied making any arrangement.

2018–present: First World Cup, 2019 Copa América
Having missed the previous World Cup due to injury, Falcao made his World Cup debut against Japan on 19 June, in Colombia's first group game of the 2018 World Cup, with Colombia losing 1–2. On 24 June, Falcao scored his first World Cup goal in Colombia's 3–0 win over Poland. After his goal, Falcao left the field to a standing ovation, and Colombia's manager, José Pékerman, stated after the game: "I think (Falcao's goal) is one of the greatest joys that we received tonight. He is a symbol of the national team, a symbol of Colombian football." Following a 1–1 draw with England in the round of 16, although Falcao converted his penalty in the shoot-out, Colombia lost 4–3.

On 30 May 2019, Falcao was included in the 23-man final Colombia squad for the 2019 Copa América. He had a poor tournament overall, with no goals or assists to his name, and didn't play the full 90 minutes in any of his matches. Colombia eventually lost 5–4 on penalties to Chile in the quarter-finals.

On 24 September 2022, he played his 100th match with Colombia in a friendly match against Guatemala.

Style of play
Falcao has been described as a "natural goal scorer" and a striker with the "ability to bag a goal from nothing". He can hold up the ball well due to his high strength and is able to play off the shoulder of the last defender. Described as a "poacher", Falcao is frequently labeled as a "pure striker", often playing as a traditional "number 9" and capitalizing on less amount of chances than the typical goal scorer. His powerful and accurate shots are highly noticeable throughout his games regardless of distance and/or positions, and he is also known to have a tendency to take curved and chip shots. Falcao is well known for having a strong weak foot (left) that is on equals with his right foot (preference), allowing him to be flexible with goal scoring. Falcao controls a well-balanced pace, helping him keep his stamina in check and allowing him to often outrun other players in the most critical 50/50 moments. While Falcao is only of average height (1.77 m), his heading and jumping technique has given him an edge in aerial battles for balls. Falcao has also been praised for his free-kick ability, which is rarely seen from a striker.

He is often regarded as one of the greatest strikers of his generation and as one of the greatest Colombian footballers of all time. In his prime before his ACL injury, he was widely considered one of the best strikers in the world. Some media outlets regarded him as the best. Falcao's talents have been recognized by many footballers and managers. Former Atletico Madrid president Enrique Cerezo thought Falcao was the "best striker in the world" and that he "wouldn't swap him for Cristiano Ronaldo or Lionel Messi." Former Barcelona and current Manchester City manager Pep Guardiola described him as "sensational" and as one of the most talented in the world. Before Falcao's ACL injury, Fabio Capello considered him to be on the same level as Lionel Messi and Cristiano Ronaldo. Hernán Crespo said Falcao was the best of "human players", also mentioning that Ronaldo and Messi are "on another level." Former Atlético Madrid teammate Gabi said in 2012 that he thought Falcao was the best at heading the ball and finishing in the world. Lionel Messi spoke highly on him: he said, "Falcao is a great player: his quality on the ball and the way he shoots are really impressive."

Outside football

Personal life

Falcao is a second generation footballer; his father, Radamel García, played professionally as a defender in Colombia and Venezuela, and moved to the latter country with the family when Falcao was five. García died on 3 January 2019, aged 61, due to cardiac arrest while playing tennis. In 2021, when Falcao joined Rayo Vallecano he chose the jersey number 3, same jersey number his father played with, to honour him. When Falcao was in Venezuela, he played baseball, the country's most popular sport. However, when the family returned to Colombia in 1995, Falcao turned his attention back to football. Falcao also has two younger sisters.

His name derives from the 1980s Brazil national team, Internacional and Roma legend Paulo Roberto Falcão, as a tribute from his father, Radamel García. Despite being named Radamel, he prefers to use his middle name in interviews. His nickname, "El Tigre" (Spanish for "The Tiger"), was given by Gonzalo Ludueña, his then-teammate at River Plate. Falcao scored two goals in a match versus Huracán, and the man of the match trophy he later won had a tiger on it, so Ludueña began to call him "El Tigre". Falcao has been married to Argentine singer and model Lorelei Tarón since December 2007; they met in a church while Falcao was playing for River at age 18. In early 2013, it was revealed that Falcao was expecting his first child with her. Dominique García Tarón was born on 13 August 2013, at the Princess Grace Hospital in La Colle, Monaco. His second daughter, Desirée García Tarón, was born in February 2015. His third daughter, Annette García Tarón, was born in August 2017. In December 2018, Falcao remarried his wife. In March 2020, both Falcao and Lorelei revealed that they were expecting their fourth child on social media. Their first son and fourth child, Jedediah García Tarón, was born in September 2020. Due to his wife's Polish ancestry, his children also hold Polish passports, thanks to Monaco teammate Kamil Glik, who helped with the process. Falcao is a devout Christian, and Gonzalo Ludueña said about his faith that, "We hid from Falcao because he would look for us in every room to take us to church on Sunday, our free day."

He is partially of English descent; George King, one of his great-grandfathers, emigrated from Selby, North Yorkshire in 1932 with his wife to work as an accountant for the United Fruit Company in Colombia and start a new life. His wife later died in childbirth, so he married a Colombian woman and had five children, including Falcao's grandmother, Denis. King was later murdered in 1960. Owing to this ancestry, Falcao's father attempted to make it easier for his son to play in Europe by obtaining a British passport for him, but this was rejected. His uncle was the telenovela and film actor Herbert King, who died in August 2018.

During Falcao's first few years with River Plate, he briefly studied journalism at University of Palermo.

Legal issues
In mid-2017, Falcao was investigated for allegations of tax evasion committed while he was playing for Atletico Madrid from 2011 to 2013. He was accused of using shell companies from the British Virgin Islands, Ireland, and Panama to avoid having to pay image rights taxes, and he was also accused of defrauding around €5.6 million of income earned from image rights. He later pled guilty and paid around €8.2 million. In May 2018, he was given a 16-month suspended sentence and a €9 million fine.

Charity work
Falcao has donated numerous times to charity organizations and people. In 2013, he convinced Swiss watchmaking company Hublot to donate US$100,000 to a United Nations program in Colombia. In January 2015, he helped a 17-year-old Colombian boy find a heart transplant donor.

Career statistics

Club

International

Honours
River Plate
 Argentine Primera División: 2007–08 Clausura

Porto
 Primeira Liga: 2010–11
 Taça de Portugal: 2009–10, 2010–11
 Supertaça Cândido de Oliveira: 2009, 2010, 2011
 UEFA Europa League: 2010–11

Atlético Madrid
 Copa del Rey: 2012–13
 UEFA Europa League: 2011–12
 UEFA Super Cup: 2012

Monaco
Ligue 1: 2016–17

Colombia U20
 South American Youth Championship: 2005

Individual
 South American Team of the Year: 2007
 Portuguese Golden Ball: 2010–11
 UEFA Europa League Top Scorer: 2010–11 (17 goals), 2011–12 (12 goals)
 UEFA Europa League Final Man of the Match: 2011, 2012
 UEFA Super Cup Man of the Match: 2012
 FIFA FIFPro World11: 2012
 Globe Best Footballer: 2012
 UNFP Ligue 1 Player of the Month: August 2017
 Coupe de la Ligue Top scorer: 2017–18 (3 goals)

Records
 Colombia all-time top scorer: 35 goals
 Top goal scorer of the UEFA Super Cup: 3 goals 
Only player to have scored a hat-trick in a single final of the UEFA Super Cup
Only player to score 4 goals in a UEFA Europa League knockout match
 One of two players to win two consecutive UEFA Europa League titles with two different teams 
 Most goals scored in a UEFA Europa League season: 17 goals
Most goals scored in the UEFA Europa League: 30 goals
Most goals scored in the UEFA Europa League knockout stages: 20 goals
Most goals in a UEFA Europa League knockout tie: 5 goals 
Most UEFA Europa League hat-tricks: 3 hat-tricks
Most goals scored in UEFA Cup/UEFA Europa League finals: 3 goals

See also 
 List of top international men's football goalscorers by country
 List of men's footballers with 100 or more international caps
 List of footballers who achieved hat-trick records

References

External links

Official profile on Atlético Madrid

Radamel Falcao García at Football-Lineups.com

1986 births
Living people
Colombian people of English descent
People from Santa Marta
Colombian Christians
Colombian footballers
Association football forwards
Lanceros Boyacá footballers
Club Atlético River Plate footballers
FC Porto players
Atlético Madrid footballers
AS Monaco FC players
Manchester United F.C. players
Chelsea F.C. players
Galatasaray S.K. footballers
Rayo Vallecano players
Categoría Primera B players
Argentine Primera División players
Primeira Liga players
La Liga players
Ligue 1 players
Premier League players
Süper Lig players
UEFA Europa League winning players
Colombia youth international footballers
Colombia under-20 international footballers
Colombia international footballers
2011 Copa América players
2015 Copa América players
2018 FIFA World Cup players
2019 Copa América players
Colombian expatriate sportspeople in Venezuela
Colombian expatriate footballers
Colombian expatriate sportspeople in Argentina
Colombian expatriate sportspeople in Portugal
Colombian expatriate sportspeople in Spain
Colombian expatriate sportspeople in Monaco
Colombian expatriate sportspeople in England
Colombian expatriate sportspeople in Turkey
Expatriate footballers in Argentina
Expatriate footballers in Portugal
Expatriate footballers in Spain
Expatriate footballers in Monaco
Expatriate footballers in England
Expatriate footballers in Turkey
Sportspeople from Magdalena Department
FIFA Century Club